

Jewish population by Metropolitan Area

Judaism is the second-largest religion practiced in New York City, with approximately 1.6 million adherents as of 2022, representing the largest Jewish community of any city in the world, greater than the combined totals of Tel Aviv and Jerusalem. Nearly half of the city’s Jews live in Brooklyn. The ethno-religious population makes up 18.4% of the city and its religious demographic makes up 8%.

Census enumerations in many countries do not record religious or ethnic background, leading to a lack of certainty regarding the exact numbers of Jewish adherents. Therefore, the following list of cities ranked by Jewish population may not be complete.

Jewish population by towns and villages as a percentage of total population
List does not include cities in Israel.

See also 
 Jewish population by country

References

External links
 Israelbooks.com The Jewish People Policy Planning Institute Annual Assessment 2004–2005: Between Thriving and Decline. Gefen Publishing House.
 Publications on Jewish population at the Berman Jewish Policy Archive @ NYU Wagner
 Jewish Population and Migration, by YIVO Encyclopedia

City
City